is a Japanese video game developed and published by Marvelous AQL. It was adapted into a manga series, Bakumatsu Rock -howling soul-, that began on September 24, 2010 and into an anime television series, Samurai Jam -Bakumatsu Rock-, that aired on July 2, 2014 to September 17, 2014. The anime was streamed on Crunchyroll. Another game, Bakumatsu Rock: Ultra Soul, was released on September 25, 2014.

Story
The story is set in the Bakumatsu era, at the end of the shoguns' rule over Japan in the middle of the 19th century. The Tokugawa shogunate uses the brainwashing Heaven's Songs by the top idols in Shinsengumi to subjugate the country and its people. In this Japan, writing or singing any songs besides the Heaven's Songs is a capital offense. Ryōma Sakamoto and the other rockers rise up and change the world with rock 'n' roll for freedom and justice.

Characters

The lead singer and guitarist of the group, his dream is to become a famous rocker and spread rock throughout Japan. During the day, he works at the local pizzeria, "Albergo di Terada". The electric guitar he carries around was given to him by Shoin Yoshida, who believed that Ryōma possesses a "Peace Soul".

One of Shoin's disciples, he plays bass guitar in the group. While he and Kogorō were on a search for their master, Shoin Yoshida, they met Ryōma and started a band. He is nicknamed "Cindy" by Ryōma. He is known for his sour face and unfriendly disposition. 

One of Shoin's disciples, he plays drums in the group. While he and Shinsaku were on a search for their master, Shoin Yoshida, they met Ryōma and started a band. He is nicknamed "Sensei" by Ryōma. He is known as a patient, mature and knowledgeable person. His special skill is inventing.  
 

A member of the Shinsengumi. He has served as both a director and a backup guitarist. He is known as a skilled swordsman. A proponent of "Heaven's Song". 
 

The top member of the Shinsengumi. He is seen playing both the guitar and the keyboard. While publicly a kind and charming idol, in private he thinks of his fans as "worthless creatures." A proponent of "Heaven's Song". 

He has worked for the Tokugawa family for many generations, and currently serves Yoshinobu. His main goal is to collect all five "Peace Souls" to enhance his magical powers. 

The fifteenth head of the Tokugawa Shogunate. He was born with the talent of "Heaven's Song" 

Director of the Tokugawa Shogunate. In the past he was in an idol band, but withdrew and is now supporting the Shinsengumi as a general producer. He is known as a big brother that everyone can rely on.

Episode list

Music
OP: Jack by vistlip
ED: Zetchō DAYBREAK (絶頂DAYBREAK) by Chō Tamashī Dan (Kishō Taniyama, Tatsuhisa Suzuki, Shōtarō Morikubo, Toshiyuki Morikawa & Kenshō Ono)
Over Mirage (非常幻想（オーバーミラージュ）) by Toshiyuki Morikawa & Kenshō Ono
Rolling Thunder by Kishō Taniyama, Tatsuhisa Suzuki, & Shōtarō Morikubo
INTERSECT by Kishō Taniyama, Toshiyuki Morikawa, & Kenshō Ono
REACTION by Tatsuhisa Suzuki
Zankyō -feedback- (残響 -feedback-) by Kenshō Ono
Hachinoji Distortion (ハチノジディストーション) by Shōtarō Morikubo

Reception
On Anime News Network, Hope Chapman, Carl Kimlinger and Rebecca Silverman gave the first episode of the anime a rating of 2 out of 5 and Theron Martin gave it a rating of 3.5 out of 5.

References

External links
 

2007 video games
Anime television series based on video games
Ichijinsha manga
Japan-exclusive video games
Josei manga
Manga based on video games
NBCUniversal Entertainment Japan
PlayStation Portable games
PlayStation Portable-only games
PlayStation Vita games
PlayStation Vita-only games
Music video games
Marvelous Entertainment franchises
Studio Deen
Sentai Filmworks
Tokyo MX original programming
Video games developed in Japan
Visual novels